Walter Michael Dennis (born July 22, 1944) is a former American football player.  A running back, he played college football at the University of Mississippi, and played professionally in the National Football League (NFL) for the Los Angeles Rams in 1968 and 1969. Dennis was drafted by the Buffalo Bills in the 1st round (8th overall) of the American Football League (AFL) 1966 draft. He was also drafted by the Atlanta Falcons in the 3rd round (33rd overall) of the National Football League 1966 draft.

References 

1944 births
Living people
People from Philadelphia, Mississippi
American football running backs
Buffalo Bills players
Los Angeles Rams players
Atlanta Falcons players
Ole Miss Rebels football players
American Football League players